Jacques Tarbé de Saint-Hardouin (1899-1956) was a French diplomat.

Early life
Jacques Tarbé de Saint-Hardouin was born on December 5, 1899. His father was Georges Tarbé de Saint-Hardouin and his mother, Renée Étienne.

Career

He served as a diplomat in Berlin in 1948. He warned that the Soviet Union might try to expel Westerners from Berlin.

He served as the French Ambassador to Turkey from 1952 to 1955.

Death

He died on September 25, 1956 in Neuilly-sur-Seine near Paris.

References

1899 births
1956 deaths
People from Reims
Ambassadors of France to Turkey
Commandeurs of the Légion d'honneur